Hydropunctaria rheitrophila is a species of freshwater, saxicolous (rock-dwelling), crustose lichen in the family Verrucariaceae. It was formally described as a new species in 1922 by German lichenologist Georg Hermann Zschacke as a species of Verrucaria. Christine Keller, Cécile Gueidan, and Holger Thüs transferred it to the newly circumscribed genus Hydropunctaria in 2009. It is one of several aquatic lichens that are in this genus. The photobiont partner of Hydropunctaria rheitrophila is a yellow-green alga (class Xanthophyceae, genus Heterococcus).

References

Verrucariales
Lichen species
Lichens described in 1922
Lichens of Europe